Saint Mary's College, also known as St. Mary's College of Madonna University, is a private college located in Orchard Lake Village, Michigan.  St. Mary's College shares its campus with St. Mary's Preparatory and SS. Cyril and Methodius Seminary.  It is located on the former site of the Michigan Military Academy.  It was founded in 1885 by Fr. Joseph Dabrowski and transferred in 2003 to become St. Mary's College of and the Orchard Lake Campus of Madonna University.  Enrollment before the transfer was about 130 and specialized in Polish and Polish-American studies.

St. Mary's College of Madonna University
St. Mary's College is now a college of Madonna University, much in the way the College of Humanities or the College of Sciences is of any university.  Baccalaureate degrees are offered in Sacred Theology, Philosophy, and Polish Studies.  St. Mary's College is host to the Catholic Integrated Core Curriculum, a set of courses taken in lieu of general education courses that seeks to integrate Faith and Reason as outlined in Pope John Paul II's encyclical Fides et Ratio, specifically through the study of philosophy, theology, and the great works of Western Civilization (literature, sculpture, etc.).

Orchard Lake Campus of Madonna University
More widely, the campus is referred to as the Orchard Lake Campus of Madonna University.  Courses taught cover a wide array of subjects including psychology, biology, business, and computer science.

Notable alumni
Dale Joseph Melczek, Bishop Emeritus of the Diocese of Gary, Indiana.
Kerry Bentivolio, former Member of the U.S. House of Representatives from Michigan's 11th congressional district.
Matt Tedder,  former student and basketball player who is known for spearheading the only NSCAA tournament win in school history.
Brian Kennedy, former student and basketball player who is known for his defensive skills, locking down opponents top player whether guard or forward, and his uncanny knack for rebounding.

References

External links
 Orchard Lake Schools

Defunct private universities and colleges in Michigan
Catholic universities and colleges in Michigan
Educational institutions established in 1885
Universities and colleges in Oakland County, Michigan
Historic district contributing properties in Michigan
1885 establishments in Michigan
National Register of Historic Places in Oakland County, Michigan
University and college buildings on the National Register of Historic Places in Michigan